Here, It Never Snowed. Afterwards It Did is a mini-album by Scottish indie rock band The Twilight Sad, released on 9 June 2008. At an acoustic performance promoting the record, singer James Graham noted that the band could have released another single from Fourteen Autumns & Fifteen Winters but ultimately decided to release a fresh batch of recordings instead.

The record includes four alternative versions of tracks taken from their debut album, Fourteen Autumns & Fifteen Winters, and two new songs: a cover of Daniel Johnston's "Some Things Last a Long Time" and the title track, "Here It Never Snowed. Afterwards It Did," a song written for their first album but never used.

Concerning the re-recording of older material, guitarist Andy MacFarlane explained:

Former Aereogramme guitarist Iain Cook recorded, mixed, and mastered the record, while former Aereogramme bassist Campbell McNeil plays on the opening track "And She Would Darken the Memory." Also, prior to the EP's release, former Aereogramme contributor Martin "Dok" Doherty joined the band during live performances, playing various instruments. Laura McFarlane, from My Latest Novel, plays violin on three tracks.

Track listing

Credits
 James Alexander Graham – vocals, lyrics
 Andy MacFarlane – guitar, fan organ, producer, mixing
 Mark Devine – drums, percussion, mixing
 Craig Orzel – bass, glockenspiel
 Iain Cook – engineer, mixing, mastering
 Laura McFarlane – violin on "And She Would Darken the Memory," "Walking for Two Hours," and "Some Things Last a Long Time"
 Campbell McNeil – bass on "And She Would Darken the Memory"
 dlt – artwork

References

2008 EPs
The Twilight Sad albums
FatCat Records EPs